John Lyons (born 3 June 1977) is a former Irish Labour Party politician who served as a Teachta Dála (TD) for the Dublin North-West constituency from 2011 to 2016.

A son of John and Josie Lyons, he attended Trinity Comprehensive (then known as Ballymun Comprehensive).

He studied at Maynooth University, gaining a BA and HDip, subsequently he studied special education at Trinity College Dublin.

He is openly gay and was one of the first two openly LGBT members of Dáil Éireann, along with Meath East's Dominic Hannigan.

He lost his seat at the 2016 general election.

References

 

1977 births
Living people
Alumni of Maynooth University
Gay politicians
Irish schoolteachers
Labour Party (Ireland) TDs
Local councillors in Dublin (city)
Members of the 31st Dáil
LGBT legislators in Ireland
Alumni of Trinity College Dublin